Hofgeismar is a town in the district of Kassel, in northern Hesse, Germany. It is located 25 km north of Kassel on the German Timber-Frame Road. In 1978 and in 2015, the town hosted the 18th Hessentag state festival.

History
The first written document mentioning Hofgeismar dates back to the year 1082.

People 
 Martin Zielke (born 1963), German banker

See also 
 Schöneberg (Hofgeismar)

References

External links
  

Kassel (district)